Reza Nasehi (born June 12, 1984) is an Iranian footballer who currently plays for Padideh in the Persian Gulf Pro League.

Club career
Nasehi joined Sepahan in 2010.

Honours

Club
Sepahan
Iranian Pro League: 2010–11, 2011–12

References

1984 births
Living people
Sportspeople from Mashhad
Iranian footballers
Persian Gulf Pro League players
F.C. Aboomoslem players
Sepahan S.C. footballers
Naft Tehran F.C. players
Aluminium Hormozgan F.C. players
Saipa F.C. players
Shahr Khodro F.C. players
Association football fullbacks
Association football midfielders